The white-thighed swallow (Atticora tibialis) is a species of bird in the family Hirundinidae. It was formerly placed in the monotypic  genus, Neochelidon.

It is found in Bolivia, Brazil, Colombia, Ecuador, French Guiana, Panama, Peru, Suriname, and Venezuela. Its natural habitat is subtropical or tropical moist lowland forests.

References

Further reading

white-thighed swallow
Birds of the Amazon Basin
Birds of Colombia
Birds of the Tumbes-Chocó-Magdalena
Birds of the Guianas
Birds of the Atlantic Forest
white-thighed swallow
Taxonomy articles created by Polbot